The 2001 Asian Youth Girls Volleyball Championship was held in Trang, Thailand from 16 to 23 April 2001.

Pools composition
The teams are seeded based on their final ranking at the 1999 Asian Youth Girls Volleyball Championship.

Preliminary round

Pool A

|}

|}

Pool B

|}

|}

Final round

Quarterfinals

|}

5th–8th semifinals

|}

Semifinals

|}

7th place

|}

5th place

|}

3rd place

|}

Final

|}

Final standing

Awards
MVP:  Huang Huiping
Best Scorer:  Huang Huiping
Best Spiker:  Huang Huiping
Best Blocker:  Huang Huiping
Best Server:  Lu Yan
Best Setter:  Zhang Qian

See also 

 Asian Youth Volleyball Championship

References
 www.jva.or.jp

External links
FIVB

A
V
Asian women's volleyball championships
V